Lauren O'Connell (born December 10, 1988) is an American singer/songwriter, multi-instrumentalist and producer from Rochester, New York. They have independently released six solo albums, and two EPs as a duo with Nataly Dawn under the group name My Terrible Friend.

Early life

Lauren O'Connell was born in Rochester, New York on December 10, 1988. They began playing guitar at the age of twelve and wrote their first song by the age of fifteen. Their early performing experience came from playing open mic nights with their high school friend, Julia Nunes. In 2007, O'Connell went to Saxon Recording in Rochester at the suggestion of a friend and recorded their debut album Sitting in Chairs with engineer Dave Anderson. They recorded the entire album in one day, using single takes of each song.

Shortly after releasing Sitting in Chairs, O'Connell began attending Binghamton University. Throughout their first year they continued to write and perform. They began uploading videos of their original songs to YouTube so that they could share them with their friends from Rochester, including Nunes. Nunes made videos as well and garnered an unexpected following, and her videos led audiences to find O'Connell's work. O'Connell's first videos were simple one-takes of original songs with guitar and voice, but they soon progressed to include cover songs with layered harmonies and accompaniment, usually with O'Connell playing all of the instruments themselves. Though they generally use traditional instruments in their songs, O'Connell has sometimes used unconventional means when recording, including wine glasses, a metal tool cabinet, kicks to a garage door, a tennis racket covered in change, and a deck of playing cards.  In late 2008, they decided to leave school and pursue music full-time.

Career 
Shortly after leaving school, O'Connell began recording their follow-up album The Shakes, which was released in early 2009.

During the summer of 2009, O'Connell met Jack Conte and Nataly Dawn of Pomplamoose when they came to New York to produce Nunes' I Think You Know EP. In 2010, O'Connell moved to Sonoma County, CA where they moved into a house with Conte and Dawn. A few months after moving to California, O'Connell and Dawn began a collaboration called My Terrible Friend. The duo recorded an EP titled Room for Ghosts in their home studio and released it on July 7, 2010. On July 20, 2010 O'Connell and Dawn were featured on the YouTube homepage for Music Tuesday, both individually and as My Terrible Friend.

Though O'Connell's fanbase was initially centered on the local area where they performed, their YouTube presence exposed their music to a much wider audience. On November 8, 2009 they played with Pomplamoose at the wedding of Take That member Mark Owen and English actress Emma Ferguson in Cawdor Church, Scotland. Ferguson, a fan of Rufus Wainwright, discovered Nataly Dawn's cover of Wainwright's song "Cigarettes and Chocolate Milk" and invited Dawn to play the song at the wedding. They then discovered Pomplamoose and O'Connell and Dawn's "The Daylight Here" and invited Conte and O'Connell to play as well.

In September 2010 O'Connell was chosen as the West Regional Winner of the 2010 Mountain Stage Newsong Contest. On October 22, 2010 they joined eleven other finalists from across America and Canada at Arts World Financial Center's Wintergarden in New York City for the Award Round performance competition and an opportunity to record an EP with Grammy winning producer Jacquire King.

On December 14, 2010, O'Connell announced that they were raising money to record a new album and were working with Pledgemusic in order to give fans an opportunity to help fund studio time, with the goal of being in the studio sometime in January 2011. In return for pledging O'Connell decided to include personalized merchandise ranging from autographed CDs and T-shirts, handwritten lyrics, and hand-drawn artwork to house concerts, their personal iPod filled with music, and even grocery shopping or mini-golf with the pledger when they come to their city for a show. The project was set for a sixty-day pledge period, however, fan pledges exceeded the target amount in the first 24 hours, making it the fastest Pledgemusic project ever to reach its goal at the time. One week later they added more of the incentives that sold out quickly as well as new incentives like the harmonicas they used for their videos and albums, a Photoshop vacation photo with the pledger, and a volleyball painted with the pledger's face in the style of "Wilson" from the movie Cast Away, joking that their New Year's resolution was to make progressively weirder arts and crafts. The project raised 268% of the original goal by the time it concluded on February 14, 2011.

Personal life 
In March 2022, O'Connell came out as genderqueer and switched to they/them pronouns.

Discography

Sitting in Chairs

O'Connell's debut album was recorded at Saxon Recording in Rochester, New York in early 2007. Sitting in Chairs was recorded in just one day, single-tracked with an acoustic guitar.

Track List
Sitting in Chairs
Levers and Gears
Good Intentions
My Equations
I'm All Talk
Chimney Smoke
Just Be
All the Perching Crows
Somewhere in Between
There Will Be

The Shakes

O'Connell's second album was recorded in late 2008 in Rochester, New York at GFI Music. It was released in early 2009. Unlike their previous album, The Shakes features accompaniment, including drums, horns, strings, and piano.

Track List
From Chambers, Slow
Chicken Wire
The Pilot
Things I Panic About
I Don't Mind
Bystander
Oncoming Traffic
1988
Sweet Lament
Tangled Up Kites

Room for Ghosts 
In the summer of 2010 O'Connell collaborated with their roommate Nataly Dawn of Pomplamoose and the duo released Room for Ghosts as My Terrible Friend in July 2010. The five track EP was recorded in their home studio and includes three original songs, as well as covers of "Diamonds and Gold" by Tom Waits and "Holy Roller Novocaine" by Kings of Leon.

Track list
When I Decide
Diamonds and Gold
Holy Roller Novocaine
The Daylight Here
Dying to Live

Quitters

On January 25, 2012, O'Connell announced via their website that they would be releasing a new album on March 2. Quitters was produced by O'Connell and engineered & mixed by Oz Fritz at Prairie Sun Studios in Cotati, California.

Track list
Every Space
I Will Burn You Down
I Belong To You
Things Are Alright
If Found/Gravity
What Breaks (and What Doesn't)
Maybe True Stories
The Same Things
In The Next Room
White Noise

Covers 
In 2012, O'Connell compiled eleven songs they had released on YouTube into their album Covers, featuring songs originally performed by Bruce Springsteen, Warren Zevon, the Everly Brothers and others, as well as two traditional American songs. Their rendition of "All I Have to Do Is Dream" was featured on The Good Wife and "House of the Rising Sun" was featured in television promos for American Horror Story's third season, Coven.

Track list
All I Have to Do Is Dream
Dancing in the Dark
Little Maggie
The Way I Feel Inside
Peacebone
Roland the Headless Thompson Gunner
The One I Love is Gone
Other People (feat. Will Sturgeon)
Don't Think Twice, It's All Right
House of the Rising Sun

Details 
On February 9, 2018, O'Connell released their fourth original album Details, an effort fan-funded via Kickstarter. The album was produced by Olivia Lee and O'Connell, and featured Lee as a guitarist as well as drummer Lauren Grubb and bassist Josh Fossgreen. It was mixed by Ian Pellicci and Beau Sorenson and mastered by T.W. Walsh. O'Connell published a companion essay for the album in which they shared experiences of mental health that informed some of the songs on the album.

Track list
Superimposed
Moon Hang Low
In on the Joke
Shimmering Silver
Guilt
Rest Easy
Out of Focus
Under Control
Knowing Her Name
Build Yourself

Covers Two 
On August 25, 2020, O'Connell released their second collection of cover songs, entitled Covers Two, featuring covers of songs by Big Star, Gillian Welch, the Magnetic Fields, Iris Dement and others.

Track list
Thirteen
Laminated Cat
Ruination Day, Pt. II
I Hear Them All
Hungry Heart
Our Town
I Fall to Pieces
Kola
Atlantic City
Heart of Gold
I Don't Want to Get Over You

Notes

References

External links 
 
 YouTube
 Lauren O'Connell Patreon
Lauren O'Connell on Bandcamp

Singer-songwriters from New York (state)
1988 births
Living people
21st-century American singers
Queer musicians
American guitarists
American folk singers
Alternative country musicians
Non-binary musicians
American producers